A list of films produced in Argentina in 2000:

2000

See also
2000 in Argentina

External links and references
 Argentine films of 2000 at the Internet Movie Database

2000
Argentine
Films